The 2016 Runnymede Borough Council election took place on 5 May 2016 to elect 15 members of Runnymede Borough Council in Surrey, England. This was on the same day as other local elections.

Election result
After the election, the composition of the council was:
Conservative: 36
Residents Association: 6

Ward results

Addlestone Bourneside

Addlestone North

Chertsey Meads

Chertsey South and Row Town

Chertsey St Ann's

Egham Hythe

Egham Town

Englefield Green East

Englefield Green West

Foxhills

New Haw

Thorpe

Virginia Water

Woodham

References

2016 English local elections
2016
2010s in Surrey